The Governor & J.J. is a television series that ran from September 1969 to December 1970 on CBS in the United States and in Canada, where it ran on CBC Television. Selected episodes were rerun by CBS during the summer of 1972. It was produced by Talent Associates and CBS Productions. CBS Television Distribution now owns the distribution rights to the program.

The series starred Dan Dailey and Julie Sommars. It focused on William Drinkwater (Dailey), a governor in an unnamed Midwestern state, who, in lieu of his late wife, had a "first lady" in his 20-something year-old daughter, Jennifer Jo (Sommars). J.J., as Jennifer Jo was called, had a regular job as an assistant curator at a zoo in the capital city and had a love for animals. She was bright and opinionated and could debate political issues with her father as well as anyone else. Despite their difference in opinions (she was more liberal, and he was more conservative), William really loved J.J., and she proved herself to be charming and efficient in her duties being "first lady" for her father. J.J. often gained support and advice from Maggie McLeod (Neva Patterson), the governor's secretary; George Callison (James T. Callahan), the governor's press secretary; and from Sara Andrews (Nora Marlowe), the housekeeper at the governor's mansion.

Broadcast history

Trivia
The series won three Golden Globe Awards in 1970 for Best Comedy Series, Best Actress in a Comedy/Musical TV series for Sommars and Best Actor in a Comedy/Musical TV Series for Dailey.

Francis De Sales guest-starred as Senator Loomis in the 1970 episode "Charley's Back in Town".

The series sometimes featured guest appearances by then current governors, including Robert Docking of Kansas and Deane C. Davis of Vermont.

In real life, Sommars has been involved in politics, mostly behind the scenes with the Republican Party.

When the program was canceled by CBS, it was replaced in its Wednesday timeslot by To Rome with Love, which had moved from Tuesdays to make room for All in the Family. To Rome with Love was canceled at the end of the 1970-71 season. CBS aired reruns of the series in the summer of 1972.

Episodes

Season 1: 1969–70

Season 2: 1970

External links

1969 American television series debuts
1970 American television series endings
1970s American political comedy television series
1960s American sitcoms
1970s American sitcoms
CBS original programming
Fictional duos
Television duos
Television series by CBS Studios
Best Musical or Comedy Series Golden Globe winners
English-language television shows
Fictional state governors of the United States
Television series by Talent Associates